The Tate's Bluff Fortification is a historic American Civil War fortification in northern Ouachita County, Arkansas.  It is located near the confluence of the Ouachita and Little Missouri Rivers, close to County Route 25.  The roughly square earthworks is believed to have been built in 1864, after Union Army forces captured Little Rock, as an effort by Confederate Army forces to fortify the Ouachita against a potential Union advance.  It saw no combat, and was probably only used as an observation and supply post.

The fortification was listed on the National Register of Historic Places in 2002.

See also
National Register of Historic Places listings in Ouachita County, Arkansas

References

External links
Tate's Bluff roadside marker description

Military facilities on the National Register of Historic Places in Arkansas
Military installations established in 1864
American Civil War forts
National Register of Historic Places in Ouachita County, Arkansas
American Civil War on the National Register of Historic Places
1864 establishments in Arkansas
American Civil War sites in Arkansas